Micronesia Mall (Japanese: ミクロネシアモール)  (Korean: 미크로네시아 몰)   (Russian: Микронезия Молл), in Dededo at the intersection of Guam highways 1 and 16, is the largest shopping center in the United States territory of Guam.

The Micronesia Mall is a shopping mall with over 100 stores and restaurants. The four anchor stores are Ross Dress for Less, two  Macy's stores, which are the only Macy's west of Hawaii, and a 24-hour Payless Supermarket. The mall is also home to stores such as Gap, Guess, Levi's, Lacoste, and Foot Locker. The mall is also home to a 24-restaurant food court and a 12-screen movie theater featuring all stadium 3D/digital technology. Funtastic Park, an amusement park is inside the mall featuring seven rides including a roller coaster, carousel, bumper cars, pirate ship, Crazy Cans, Jungle Safari, Lady Bug and an arcade.

Other retail chains include ABC Store, GameStop, Vitamin World, GNC, Bench, GTA, and Docomo Pacific. Toys "R" Us’ only location in Guam was in this mall up until the 2018 Bankruptcy, the store closed on June 27, with no prior announcement or liquidation sale.

Fast food, restaurant and snack chains include Burger King, Panda Express, Cold Stone Creamery, Häagen-Dazs, Denny's, Great American Cookies, KFC, Pretzelmaker, Raising Cane's, Sbarro, Subway, Taco Bell, Tutti Frutti, Chatime, Coffee Beanery, Honolulu Cookie Company, Cinnabon, Pepper Lunch, Robeks, as well as Jollibee and Winchell's Donuts on the outskirts of the mall.

History

The Micronesia Mall opened on August 8, 1988, a date chosen by its owners for luck: The number "8" is considered a lucky number by Chinese and other Asian cultures. Its first store was a Sterling Department Store, which opened ahead of the rest of the mall. The store was later purchased by Liberty House, which was replaced by Macy's in 2001. A major expansion was completed in 1988, doubling the mall's size.

References

External links

Official マイクロネシアモール website in Japanese

Shopping malls in Guam
Shopping malls established in 1988
1988 establishments in Guam
Dededo, Guam